is a 1991 OVA anime series produced by Artmic and Artland. It is the sequel to the 1987 OVA series Bubblegum Crisis, taking place a year after the series. The Knight Sabers seem to be finished, as each of its members except Nene Romanova have seemingly drifted off to pursue their own goals. But at the same time, a recent string of robberies, murders, and Boomer malfunctions begin to occur. Knight Sabers' leader Sylia Stingray is then forced to recruit Nene and the other members back together. The group tries to find out who or what is behind the recent string of crimes which are somehow related to the creation of an advanced artificial intelligence.

After the split between Artmic and Youmex, Artmic proceeded to make Bubblegum Crash on their own, which ran three OVA episodes and is conjectured that it was a shortened version of how Bubblegum Crisis was to end. Youmex then sued Artmic, cutting the series short and tying the franchise up in legal issues until the late 1990s, when Artmic went bankrupt and Youmex was absorbed into Toshiba EMI.

Upon release, the series received mixed reviews from fans and critics.

Plot
Bubblegum Crash takes place in 2034, one year after the events of Bubblegum Crisis. The Knight Sabers have broken up, as each of its members have moved on to pursue their own life goals as things seemed to have calmed down. Knight Sabers leader and founder Sylia Stingray has disappeared. The group's number two, Japanese-American musician Priscilla "Priss" Asagiri, has stumbled from one manager to another. Nene Romanova, the IT expert of the Knight Sabers, is still working with the AD Police and trying to keep the Knight Saber ideal alive, and Linna Yamazaki has moved into playing the Japanese stock market and has gotten rich as a result. Things are quiet, until a group of mercenaries called the Illegal Army begin attacking tech companies across Tokyo, and they steal rare parts from them. As a result, Sylia is forced to bring Nene and the other members back together. They then try to find out who or what is behind the recent string of robberies, murders, and Boomer malfunctions caused by the Illegal Army which are related to the creation of an advanced artificial intelligence.

Characters

The characters are similar to those in the Bubblegum Crisis OVA series.

 (spelled Silia in Bubblegum Crisis)

Sylia is the 22-year-old ringleader of the Knight Sabers. She is a Hafu of British descent. Very calm and cool-headed, she does not show much emotion. She is the daughter of Dr. Katsuhito Stingray, the man who originally created the boomers. Sylia is a wealthy businesswoman whose business ventures, aside from the mercenaries' fee, finance the team. Her primary business is the lingerie shop "Silky Doll" she personally runs, housed in her private building, Lady's 633, on whose top is also her penthouse apartment functioning as the Knight Sabers' base of operations. She wears a blue and silver Hard Suit equipped with retractable sword blades in the forearms, laser cannons in the palms and wings for full flight capability.

Priss is the strongest member of the Knight Sabers, specializing in heavy assault. The Japanese-American vocalist of an underground rock band, Priss is an orphan of the 2025 Kantō earthquake, who joined a biker gang. After her boyfriend was killed and his death declared insignificant by the police (giving her a dislike for the law enforcement), she attempted to hunt down the killers, but she was recruited into the Knight Sabers instead. She wears a dark blue Hard Suit, which features a railgun in the right hand as well as a laser gun in the original series and her signature knuckle bombers (explosive charges in both hands of her hard suit). In Crash, her suit becomes a modular core system to which a variety of selective heavy weapons can be attached.

Linna is a member of the Knight Sabers. She is the only member of the Sabers that is not a Hafu. Linna dons a green Hard Suit equipped with "ribbon cutters", which are long, electrically charged nanomolecular ropes mounted behind the helmet that can be used to slash through Boomers and other high-tech opponents. Like Priss, she is also armed with explosive knuckle bombers as well as a finger-mounted triplet laser gun. In Crash, the knuckle bombers and lasers are replaced with electrically charged twin wire-daggers. Working as an aerobics instructor, Linna once hoped to pursue a career in professional dancing, but her efforts went unappreciated by all but Sylia, who recruited her into the Sabers. Eventually, her constant greed makes her switch to stockbroker consulting in Crash.

Nene is the youngest member of the Knight Sabers, acting as the IT expert of the group and as an officer of the AD Police, functioning as the group's mole in the ADP. She is a Hāfu of Russian descent. She is bubbly, naive, has an affinity for candy and junk food, and is blissfully inept with real world logic. Due to her lack of (and unwillingness to engage in) regular exercise, she is often teased by Priss and Linna for not being more physically durable. Nene's blue and pink Hard Suit's offensive weapon is a laser gun unsuited for taking out enemies; instead, it is used to scribble the Knight Sabers' signature onto their scene of actions. She relies on her suit's computer and electronic warfare systems to stay away from an enemy. She gets another new suit in Crash. Her suit's offensive capabilities are stocked up considerably with an electromagnetic pulse striker and the capability of physically hacking into a Boomer's computer brain.

Leon McNichol

An A.D. Police officer from America, Leon is a dedicated cop with a tendency to rush in without thinking. He is a skilled powered armor pilot, one of the A.D. Police's aces in its K-11 and K-12S powered suits. Leon has a crush on Priss, which she does not like since she has a grudge against the A.D. Police.

Daley Wong

Daley is Leon's partner and a highly skilled investigator. He is Chinese-American and openly homosexual. He flirts openly with the heterosexual Leon whenever Leon's temper tends to get the better of him, and Leon often reciprocates with good humor.

Episodes

Cast

Additional voices
Japanese: Norio Tsukui, Takako Kikuchi, Toshiyuki Morikawa

English (Southwynde Studios): Amanda Tancredi, Chuck Kinlaw, Grenoldo Frazier, Jack Bowden, Lou Criscuolo, Matthew Alexander, Michael Sinterniklaas, Scott Simpson, Sean Clay, Sophia Tolar, Steve Vernon, Zach Hanner

Reception
Critical reception of Bubblegum Crash has been mixed. Both critics and fans consider it to be a downgrade compared to Bubblegum Crisis and its reboot Tokyo 2040.

Raphael See of THEM Anime Reviews gave Crash a rating of 3 out of 5 stars, praising the artwork and character development, but criticized the designs of the Boomers, as well as noting that "the biggest complaint that fans have against Crash is that it doesn't live up to the tone or flavor of Crisis. That much is true - Bubblegum Crash takes itself MUCH less seriously than Crisis. Less charitable critics sometimes call Crash 'Sailor Moon in Hardsuits.'" Overall, See concludes that Crash is not bad, but that "die-hard Crisis fans will probably want to stay away."

Christopher Macdonald of Anime News Network gave the series a rating of C+, handing out praise for the artwork, animation, and some of the story, but criticized the lighter tone of the series compared to Bubblegum Crisis, the soundtrack, and for not keeping continuity in the Knight Sabers' personalities between the original and the sequel. He states that "it isn't as good as Crisis, but it's still not that bad. However, sequels are never judged exclusively on their own merits; they are judged in comparison with the original, and Crash simply doesn't have the character of Crisis."

References

External links
 Bubblegum Crash website
 Bubblegum Crisis – AIC's official Bubblegum Crisis page 
 
 

 
1991 anime OVAs
Action anime and manga
Anime International Company
Artificial intelligence in fiction
Cyberpunk anime and manga
Dengeki Comics
Fiction about robots
Girls with guns anime and manga
Mecha anime and manga
Science fiction anime and manga
Seinen manga
Television series set in the 2030s